The FAW Oley (一汽欧朗) is a subcompact car available as sedan and hatchback bodystyles produced by the FAW Group under the Oley brand.

Overview
The Oley sedan was originally codenamed the A130 during development phase, and was originally developed as a subcompact named the B30 for the Bestune (Besturn at the time) brand. The Oley was built on the PQ32+ platform developed from the Mark 2 Volkswagen Jetta platform built by FAW Volkswagen. The platform was criticized for being cheap and the design was criticized for being too radical for the Bestune brand, which led to FAW launching the Oley brand as a brand for younger generations.

The Oley brand was revealed in November 2011. In March 2012, and the first product, the Oley sedan was launched in the Chinese market. The production Oley sedan was previewed by the GO Concept during the 2011 Shanghai Auto Show. Production started on Marth 7, 2012.

The Oley subcompact is powered by a 1.5-litre engine codenamed CA4GA5 producing a maximum output of 102hp and 135nm. Transmission is either a 5-speed manual transmission or a 4-speed automatic transmission.

The Oley hatchback was unveiled during the 2013 Shanghai Auto Show, and was launched in the Chinese market in December 2013. The hatchback features the same interior and powertrain as the sedan launched in 2012.

FAW Oley EV
The Oley EV is the electric version of the Oley hatchback, and was launched on the Chinese car market in the second quarter of 2015. The Oley EV is powered by an electric motor with an output of 47hp with electricity coming from a  lithium-ion battery pack. The range of the Oley EV is 150 kilometer and the top speed is 140 kilometer per hour. FAW claims the acceleration from 0 to 50 kilometers per hour is 6.8 seconds and 4 seconds for acceleration from 50 to 80 kilometers per hour. The curb weight of the Oley EV is 1250 kg. Charging takes 48 minutes for 80% battery on a fast charger.

References

External links
 FAW Oley - Specifications. Chinese cars
 FAW Oley sales data

Subcompact cars
Sedans
hatchbacks
Cars of China
Cars introduced in 2012
Front-wheel-drive vehicles
Production electric cars